Consejo de Todas las Tierras or Aukiñ Wallmapu Ngulam (AWNg) is an indigenista organization that defines itself as aimed to create a "Mapuche state" in Chile and Argentina. Its leader is the werkén Aucán Huilcamán. The organization has its roots in the «Comisión 500 años de resistencia» (Commission for the 500 years of resistance), created in 1989 as a splinter group of ADMAPU, whose members had become critical of ADMAPU. The commission subsequently changed name to Consejo de Todas las Tierras in 1990.

References

Bibliography 
 Christian Martínez Neira (2009). "Transición a la democracia, militancia y proyecto étnico. La fundación de la organización mapuche Consejo de Todas las Tierras (1978-1990)", en Estudios Sociológicos, Vol. XXVII, número 80, Mayo-Agosto.

External links 
 Wallmapuche.cl: órgano difusor del Consejo de Todas las Tierras 

Mapuche organizations
Indigenous organisations in Chile
Indigenous rights organizations in South America
1990 establishments in Chile
Mapuche conflict